Digi.no is a Norwegian online newspaper covering news within information technology and telecommunications. It is published in Oslo by Teknisk Ukeblad Media. The publication has eight journalists. The editor in chief is Ida Oftebro.
When Digi was founded in August 1996 it was the first completely online newspaper in Europe.

In 2000 the site changed its name to digitoday.no, and was planning to establish a news service in other Nordic and European countries. The first subsidiary, digitoday.fi, was established in Finland. In 2001, Telenor purchased the company and cancelled the internationalisation effort. The subsidiary in Finland was sold to its employees, and digitoday.no got back its old name digi.no.

References

Newspapers published in Oslo
Publications established in 1996
1996 establishments in Norway
Norwegian news websites
DigiTheWeb - A Digital Platform for Web Publication